The Livermore Optical Transient Imaging System, or LOTIS,
is an automated telescope designed to slew very rapidly to the location of gamma-ray bursts (GRBs), to enable the simultaneous measurement of optical counterparts.  Since GRBs can occur anywhere in the sky, are often poorly localized, and fade very quickly, this implies very rapid slewing (less than 10 sec) and a wide field of view (greater than 15 degrees).  To achieve the needed response time, LOTIS was fully automated and connected via Internet socket to the Gamma-ray Burst Coordinates Network.   This network analyzes telemetry from satellite such as HETE-2 and Swift Gamma-Ray Burst Mission and delivers GRB coordinate information in real-time.  The optics were built from 4 commercial tele-photo lenses of 11 cm aperture, with custom 2048 X 2048 CCD cameras, and could view a 17.6 X 17.6 degree field.

LOTIS started routine operation in October 1996, with a limiting magnitude Mv≈11.5 .  In March 1998 it was upgraded with cooled cameras,
resulting in a limiting sensitivity of Mv≈14.  It was in operation until at least 2001, but never successfully detected the optical counterpart of a GRB, though it did set upper limits.
By 2001, the 4 cameras had been co-aligned and two of them had added filters. 
In the idle time between GRB triggers, LOTIS systematically surveyed the entire available sky every night for new optical transients.  LOTIS was succeeded by another robotic telescope with a larger mirror but smaller field of view, called Super-LOTIS.

See also
Robotic Optical Transient Search Experiment, another similar wide field robotic telescope for GRB follow-up.

References

Optical telescopes
Gamma-ray astronomy